New Strabane Park is a cricket ground in Strabane, Northern Ireland.

History
The ground was established in 2008 as a replacement for the original Strabane Park, which is now the site of an ASDA superstore. The first major match played on the ground came nine years later in a List A match between North West Warriors and Northern Knights in the 2017 Inter-Provincial Cup, with the match ending in no result due to rain. Later that season North West Warriors played a Twenty20 match at the ground against Northern Knights in the Inter-Provincial Trophy.

See also
List of North West Warriors grounds
List of cricket grounds in Ireland

References

External links
New Strabane Park at CricketArchive

Cricket grounds in Northern Ireland
Sports venues in County Tyrone
Sports venues completed in 2008
2008 establishments in Northern Ireland
21st-century architecture in Northern Ireland